Roel Reiné (born 15 July 1970 in Eindhoven) is a Dutch film director. Occasionally he uses the alias John Rebel (Bear, Wolf Town). His production company is called Rebel Film.

Career

Starting off directing television series and films in his home country, Reiné moved to Hollywood and began specializing in direct to DVD sequels such as Death Race 2 and Hard Target 2. He also became involved with television in the United States, directing episodes of Marvel's Inhumans, Wu Assassins and Halo. Reiné also serves as cinematographer on many of his projects.

Filmography

Series

"De uitdaging" (1990)
"12 steden, 13 ongelukken" (1990)
"Sam sam" (1994)
"Voor hete vuren" (1995)
"Brutale meiden" (1997)
"Sterker dan drank" (1997)
"'t Zal je gebeuren..." (1998)
"De aanklacht" (2000)
"Verkeerd verbonden" (2000)
Blood Drive (2017)
Marvel's Inhumans (2017)
Wu Assassins (2019)
Halo (2022)

Films

No More Control (1996)
Carwars (1999)
The Delivery (1999)
Adrenaline (2003)
Deadwater (2007)
Pistol Whipped (2008)
 Drifter (2008) 
The Forgotten Ones (2009)	
The Marine 2 (2009)
Bear (2010)
The Lost Tribe (2010)
Death Race 2 (2010)
The Scorpion King 3: Battle for Redemption (2012)
Death Race 3: Inferno (2013)
12 Rounds 2: Reloaded (2013)
Dead in Tombstone (2013)
SEAL Team 8: Behind Enemy Lines (2014)
The Condemned 2 (2015)
Michiel de Ruyter (2015)
The Man with the Iron Fists 2 (2015)
Hard Target 2 (2016)
Dead Again in Tombstone (2017)
Redbad (2018)
Fistful of Vengeance (2022)

References

External links
 
 

1970 births
Living people
Dutch film directors
People from Eindhoven
Golden Calf winners